Calliostoma paradigmatum is a species of sea snail, a marine gastropod mollusk in the family Calliostomatidae.

Some authors place this taxon in the subgenus Calliostoma (Fautor).

Description

Distribution
This species occurs in the Pacific Ocean off New Caledonia at depths between 470 m and 775 m.

References

 Marshall, B.A. (1995). Calliostomatidae (Gastropoda: Trochoidea) from New Caledonia, the Loyalty Islands and the northern Lord Howe Rise . pp. 381–458 in Bouchet, P. (ed.). Résultats des Campagnes MUSORSTOM, Vol. 14 . Mém. Mus. natn. Hist. nat. 167 : 381-458
 Vilvens C. (2012) New species and new records of Seguenzioidea and Trochoidea (Gastropoda) from French Polynesia. Novapex 13(1): 1-23

External links

paradigmatum
Gastropods described in 1995